Cerithiopsida elegans is a species of sea snails in the family Newtoniellidae.

Distribution
This marine species is found off the Kurile Islands.

References 

 Kantor Yu.I. & Sysoev A.V. (2006) Marine and brackish water Gastropoda of Russia and adjacent countries: an illustrated catalogue. Moscow: KMK Scientific Press. 372 pp. + 140 pls.

External links 

 Cerithiopsida elegans at the World Register of Marine Species (WoRMS)
 
 Cerithiopsis elegans at Biolib.cz

Ptenoglossa
Gastropods described in 1978
Kuril Islands